Ken Carson may refer to:
 Ken Carson (entertainer) (1914–1994), American entertainer
 Ken Carson (rapper) (born 2000), American rapper and producer
 Ken (doll), fashion doll named Kenneth Carson

See also
 Ken Kurson (born 1968), American political consultant